This list of Majaa Talkies episodes consists of episodes from the 2015 format of the Colors Kannada television series Majaa Talkies.

Series overview

List of Episodes
Featured promotions are Kannada films, unless otherwise noted.

Season 1

Episodes 1 to 100

Episodes 101 to 200

Episode 201 to 264

Season 2

Episode 1 to 100

References

Lists of non-fiction television series episodes
Lists of Indian television series episodes